Andrew Lumsden (born 10 November 1962) is a British organist and musician. He has been organist and director of music at Winchester Cathedral from 2002.

The son of musician and choirmaster David Lumsden, he trained at Winchester College, RSAMD and St John's College, Cambridge, before taking up the position of assistant organist at Southwark Cathedral in 1985. From there he moved to Westminster Abbey in 1988 as sub-organist and then to Lichfield Cathedral in 1992 as organist and master of the choristers until moving to Winchester in 2002. He is currently the director of the Waynflete Singers.

References

External Links
 
 

1962 births
English classical organists
British male organists
Cathedral organists
English conductors (music)
British male conductors (music)
Living people
21st-century British conductors (music)
21st-century organists
21st-century British male musicians
People educated at Winchester College
Alumni of the Royal Conservatoire of Scotland
Alumni of St John's College, Cambridge
Male classical organists